London Road is one of the oldest neighbourhoods in Lethbridge, Alberta. It is located in South Lethbridge and borders downtown, as well as Midtown and the Upper East Side. It is an L-shaped area defined by 6 Avenue, Stafford Drive, 3 Avenue, 13 Street, 9 Avenue and Scenic Drive.

History

As early as 1885, plots in the London Road area were surveyed as part of the original Lethbridge town survey. The area surveyed included a five-block area between 4 and 9 streets and 6 and 7 Avenues. Roughly half of all houses in the neighbourhood were built between 1890–1914, a period of time that saw rapid population growth throughout Western Canada. The remainder of the original housing occurred primarily after World War II. Most current development consists of renovations and replacements.

Land use and recreation

Land use in London Road is primarily residential, with 80% of all uses being of a single family residence or single family with basement suite.

Parks in the neighbourhood include:

 Kiwanis Greenacres Park
 Kinsmen Park
 London Road Park

References

External links
London Road Neighbourhood Association
Neighbourhood map

Neighbourhoods in Lethbridge